Fismes station (French: Gare de Fismes) is a railway station located in the French municipality of Fismes, in the département of Marne.

History 
Opened by the Compagnie des chemins de fer des Ardennes on 16 April 1862, the line between Soissons and Reims included a station in Fismes.

Since 3 April 2016, the train link between Fismes and La Ferté-Milon has been replaced by a similar bus service.

Services 
The station building is equipped with a passenger waiting room, staffed ticket window and automatic ticket vending machines.

The station is served by TER Grand Est trains towards Reims.

Station facilities also include parking for personal automobiles and bikes.

Gallery

References 

Railway stations in Marne (department)
Railway stations in France opened in 1862